The 2018–19 North Texas Mean Green men's basketball team represented the University of North Texas during the 2018–19 NCAA Division I men's basketball season. The Mean Green, led by second-year head coach Grant McCasland, played their home games at UNT Coliseum, nicknamed The Super Pit, in Denton, Texas, as members of Conference USA.

Previous season 
The Mean Green finished the 2017–18 season 20–18, 8–10 in C-USA play to finish in a tie for seventh place. They lost in the first round of the C-USA tournament to Louisiana Tech. They were invited to participate in the College Basketball Invitational where they defeated South Dakota, Mercer, and Jacksonville State to advance to the best-of-three finals series against San Francisco. After losing in game 1, they won games 2 and 3 to become CBI champions. They also had the biggest crowd since 2010 at 6,291.

Departures

Incoming Transfers

Recruiting class of 2018

Recruiting class of 2019

Roster

Schedule and results

|-
!colspan=12 style=| Non-conference regular season

|-
!colspan=12 style=| Conference USA regular season

|-
!colspan=12 style=| Conference USA tournament

Source

See also
 2018–19 North Texas Mean Green women's basketball team

References

North Texas Mean Green men's basketball seasons
North Texas
North Texas Mean Green men's b
North Texas Mean Green men's b